Ruyi Du Ab District is a district in Samangan Province, northern Afghanistan. The estimated population in 2019 was 50,661.

References

Districts of Samangan Province